Yumurí may refer to:

Yumurí River, river in Cuba, which drains into Bahia de Matanzas, an arm of the Straits of Florida in the historic provincial capital of Matanzas
Yumurí, Cuban opera by Eduardo Sánchez (composer)
Moisés Valle (Yumurí) leader of the band Yumurí y sus Hermanos since 1992